Satyabrat Kalita is an Asom Gana Parishad politician from Assam, India. He has been elected in Assam Legislative Assembly election in 2016 from Kamalpur.

References 

Living people
Asom Gana Parishad politicians
Assam MLAs 2016–2021
People from Kamrup district
Year of birth missing (living people)